Ancylosis lacteicostella is a species of snout moth in the genus Ancylosis. It was described by Ragonot in 1887 from Uzbekistan, but is also found in Russia.

The wingspan is about 18 mm.

References

Moths described in 1887
lacteicostella
Moths of Asia